Diplomatic relations were established in the late 19th century, between Argentina and Japan.

Early contacts 
According to a file of the Royal Court of Córdoba, Argentina, there was a Japanese young man baptized as Francisco Xapon, which indicated his arrival in the country. He was sold as a slave in 1596 by the slave merchant Diego López de Lisboa, to the priest Miguel Jerónimo de Porras. In 1598, Xapón won liberty at a trial, and was released.
The history of Japanese-Argentine relations was influenced to a large extent by Argentina being a country of immigration. The first known Japanese to immigrate to Argentina arrived by boat in 1886. Among the Japanese to immigrate to Argentina was Professor Seizo Itoh, expert on agriculture, who came to Argentina in 1910 and worked to improve the level of agriculture in his new country.

The Empire of Japan and Argentine Republic established formal diplomatic relations at a Legation level with a Treaty of Amity, Commerce and Navigation on February 3, 1898. Following the conclusion of the agreement, regular trade relations by sea began in 1899.

Argentina assisted Japan in the Russo-Japanese War by agreeing to sell Japan the cruiser Nisshin, which had originally been purchased for the Argentine Navy.  However, prior to 1941, the main aspect of relations between Argentina and Japan was immigration, mostly of agricultural laborers.  There are currently an estimated 10,000 people of Japanese descent living in Argentina.

Diplomatic relations between Japan and Argentina were raised to Embassy level in 1940, and the following year Rodolfo Morena was appointed the first Argentine Ambassador to Japan, while Akira Tomii became the first Japanese Ambassador to Argentina. Relations were severed in 1944, and on March 27, 1945, the Argentine government entered World War II on the Allied side and declared war on the Japanese Empire.

Modern developments 

Diplomatic relations were restored by the signing of the San Francisco Peace Treaty in 1952. Argentine president Arturo Frondizi visited Japan in 1960, and subsequently bilateral trade and Japanese investment into Argentina have increased in importance. Japanese imports were primarily foodstuffs and raw materials, while exports were mostly machinery and finished products. In addition, agreements on cooperation in various aspects were concluded. In 1963, the two governments concluded agreement on immigration, in 1967 a treaty of amity, commerce and navigation and in 1981 agreements on technical cooperation and cultural exchange.

Argentina maintains an embassy in Tokyo and Japan maintains an embassy in Buenos Aires.

High-level visits 
Members of the Imperial Family of Japan have visited Argentina on a number of occasions, including Prince and Princess Takamado in 1991, Emperor and Empress Akihito in 1997 and Prince and Princess Akishino in 1998. Argentine President Raúl Alfonsín visit Japan in 1986, as did President Carlos Menem in 1990, 1993 and 1998.

See also 

 Asian Argentine

References

External links
  List of Treaties ruling relations Argentina and Japan (Argentine Foreign Ministry) 
  Argentine embassy in Tokyo 
  Japanese Foreign Ministry about Argentina
 Japanese embassy in Buenos Aires 
 Historical Timeline of Japanese Argentine

 
Japan 
Bilateral relations of Japan